Whitfield is an unincorporated community and census-designated place in Santa Rosa County, Florida, United States. Its population was 295 as of the 2010 census. Florida State Road 87 passes through the community.

Geography

References

Unincorporated communities in Santa Rosa County, Florida
Unincorporated communities in Florida
Census-designated places in Santa Rosa County, Florida
Census-designated places in Florida